USST may refer to: 

the United States Ski Team
the University of Saskatchewan Space Design Team
the University of Shanghai for Science and Technology, China
 United States Steel Tug, a former ship prefix used in the US Navy (e.g. USST 488)
 U.S. Smokeless Tobacco Company